Emanuel David "Rudy" Rudolph (9 September 1927, Brooklyn – 22 June 1992, Columbus, Ohio) was a botanist, lichenologist, and historian of botany. He was "the first botanist to conduct diverse experiments on the total biology of lichens in both polar regions".

Biography
After graduating from Brooklyn's Erasmus Hall High School in 1945, Emanuel D. Rudolph served in the U.S. Army from 1945 to 1946. He studied in 1947 at Brooklyn College, from 1948 to 1950 at Hunter College, and in 1945 and again from 1947 to 1950 at New York University, where he graduated in 1950 with a bachelor's degree in biology. From 1950 to 1951 he was a docent at the Brooklyn Children's Museum. In 1951 he matriculated at Washington University in St. Louis and graduated there in 1955 with a Ph.D. in botany. His thesis, written under the supervision of Carroll William Dodge, is entitled Revisionary Studies in the Lichen Family Blasteniaceae in North America North of Mexico. At Wellesley College he was an instructor from 1955 to 1959 and an assistant professor from 1959 to 1961. In Ohio State University's Department of Botany and Plant Pathology, he was from 1961 to 1964 an assistant professor, from 1964 to 1969 an associate professor, from 1969 to 1989 a full professor, and from 1990 to 1992 professor emeritus. From 1978 to 1987 he chaired the department of botany. He supervised the doctoral dissertations of 4 Ph.D. students and taught courses in "general biology, general botany, lichenology, mycology, history of botany, and history of biology." He published 195 book reviews.

At scientific meetings or in special lectures, he presented over 100 papers. He was the author or coauthor of over 350 articles, "of which about half were in the history of botany."

In 1962 Rudolph joined the Ohio Academy of Science (founded in 1891) and served the Academy in several capacities — when he unexpectedly died in June 1992 he was the Academy's president-elect (as of April 1992). He was from 1974 to 1980 an associate editor for the Academy's Ohio Journal of Science and served as its book review editor from 1965 to 1974. At annual meetings of the Academy, he presented many "research papers on polar biology, lichenology, and the history of biology and botany."

He was elected in 1959 a fellow in the American Association for the Advancement of Science, in 1965 a fellow of the Ohio Academy of Science, and in 1974 a fellow of the Linnean Society of London. In 1965 the Rudolph Glacier in northern Victoria Land, Antarctica, was named in his honor. In 1969 he received the United States Antarctica Service Medal. He was honored in 1955 by the naming of the Antarctican lichen species genus Catillaria rudolphi and in 1980 by the naming of the Farallon Islands lichen genus Edrudia.

Rudolph and his wife joined the Ohio Academy of Science. She predeceased him. They collected a personal library of over 53,000 scientific and technical books, which was donated to Ohio State University (OSU) after his death. He bequeathed his collection of 7,000 botanical prints to OSU's Chadwick Arboretum & Learning Gardens. When he died in a traffic accident, his donated kidneys enabled two people to continue living.

Selected publications

Articles
 
  (See Hallett Station.)
 
 
  (Umbilicaria papulosa is a homotypic synonym for Lasallia papulosa.)
  (See chapbook.)
 
 
 
 
 
  (See Almira Hart Lincoln Phelps.)

Books

References

External links
 
 

1927 births
1992 deaths
20th-century American botanists
American historians of science
American lichenologists
Historians of biology
New York University alumni
Washington University in St. Louis alumni
Wellesley College faculty
Ohio State University faculty
Fellows of the American Association for the Advancement of Science
Fellows of the Linnean Society of London
People from Brooklyn
Historians from New York (state)